The Department of Mineral Resources is a department of the national government of South Africa which is responsible for overseeing the mining industry of South Africa and the exploitation of the country's mineral resources. The department's origins lie the creation in the 1890s of the "" (Department of Mining) in the government of the Transvaal Republic. It has existed under its current name since 2009 when the Department of Minerals and Energy was divided and the Department of Energy was created.  the political head of the department, the Minister of Mineral Resources, is  Ngoako Ramatlhodi and his deputy is Godfrey Oliphant.

In the beginning of June 2014, during the platinum wage dispute between mining companies and the Association of Mineworkers and Construction Union (AMCU), Ramatlhodi threatened that the mineral resources department would withdraw from the negotiation process. An agreement between the sides was reached by the end of the same month.

In September 2015, Mosebenzi Joseph Zwane was appointed as the Minister of Mineral Resources.[3] The replacement of Ngoako Ramatlhodi was considered controversial and greeted with criticism from Labour Unions.

On his appointment, Zwane urged a quick resolution to mining disputes and labour disruptions. In 2016, he was applauded for his resolution of Section 54 mine stoppage issues that had been negatively impacting mine production.

In January 2017, during a judgement on the case between Aquila Steel and six respondents, which include the Minister of Mineral Resource and the department management, the Guateng division of the High Court of South Africa stated that the DMR stood in the way of private investment into the mining industry in South Africa, and failed to resolve central issues in a time effective and responsible manner, thus building a solid case for its own substitution.

The department has its head office in the Trevenna Office Campus in Sunnyside, a suburb of the national capital Pretoria. There are regional offices in Polokwane, eMalahleni, Johannesburg, Klerksdorp, Durban, Port Elizabeth, Mthatha, Cape Town, Kimberley, Springbok and Welkom. The department had 1 099 employees in 2012, and received a budget of R1 394 million for the 2013–14 financial year.

The department's chief inspector of mines is David Msiza.

References

Mineral Resources
South Africa
Mining in South Africa
Minderal